Richard Scott Prather (September 9, 1921 – February 14, 2007) was an American mystery novelist, best known for creating the "Shell Scott" series. He also wrote under the pseudonyms David Knight and Douglas Ring.

Biography 
Prather was born in Santa Ana, California and spent a year at Riverside Junior College (now Riverside Community College). He served in the United States Merchant Marine during World War II, from 1942 through the end of the war, in 1945. That year he married Tina Hager and began working as a civilian chief clerk of surplus property at March Air Force Base in Riverside, California. He left that job to become a full-time writer in 1949. The first Shell Scott mystery, Case of the Vanishing Beauty, was published in 1950. It would be the start of a long series that numbered more than three dozen titles featuring the Shell Scott character.

At Prather's death in 2007, he had completed but not published his last Shell Scott Mystery. His final novel, The Death Gods, was published October 2011, in print and ebook formats by Pendleton Artists, with permission of the Richard S. Prather Estate and Linda Pendleton.

Publisher
Prather had a disagreement with his publisher, Pocket Books, and sued them in 1975. He gave up writing for several years and grew avocados. In 1986, he returned with The Amber Effect. In 1987, Prather's penultimate book, Shellshock, was published in hardcover by Tor Books. He donated his papers to the Richard S. Prather Manuscript Collection at the University of Wyoming, in Laramie, Wyoming.

Personal life
Prather's wife, Tina Hager, died in April 2004 after 58 years of marriage.

Awards and honors 
 Private Eye Writers of America Lifetime Achievement Award (1986)
 Twice served on the board of directors of the Mystery Writers of America

Bibliography

Shell Scott novels 
 Case of the Vanishing Beauty — 	 1950
 Bodies in Bedlam — 	 1951
 Everybody Had a Gun — 	 1951
 Find This Woman — 	 1951
 Dagger of Flesh — 	 1952
 Darling, It's Death —	 1952
 Way of a Wanton — 	 1952
 Always Leave 'em Dying — 	 1953
 Ride a High Horse a.k.a. Too Many Crooks —1953
 Pattern for Panic — 	 1954
 Strip for Murder — 	 1956
 The Wailing Frail — 	 1956
 The Deadly Darling — 	 1957
 Have Gat - Will Travel (short stories) —	 1957
 Three's a Shroud (novelettes) — 1957
 The Scrambled Yeggs (published in 1952 as Pattern for Murder under pseudonym "David Knight") — 1958
 Slab Happy — 	 1958
 Take a Murder, Darling — 	 1958
 Over Her Dear Body — 	 1959
 Double in Trouble (with Stephen Marlowe, co-starring Marlowe's series character Chester Drum) — 1959
 Dance with the Dead — 	 1960
 Dig That Crazy Grave — 	 1961
 Shell Scott's Seven Slaughters (short stories) —	 1961
 Kill the Clown — 	 1962
 Dead Heat — 	 1963
 The Cockeyed Corpse — 	 1964
 Joker in the Deck —	 1964
 The Trojan Hearse — 	 1964
 Dead Man's Walk — 	 1965
 Kill Him Twice — 	 1965
 The Meandering Corpse — 	 1965
 The Kubla Khan Caper — 	 1966
 Gat Heat — 	 1967
 The Cheim Manuscript — 	 1969
 Kill Me Tomorrow — 	 1969
 The Shell Scott Sampler (short stories) — 1969
 Dead-Bang — 	 1971
 The Sweet Ride — 	 1972
 The Sure Thing — 	 1975
 The Amber Effect — 	 1986
 Shellshock — 	 1987
 The Death Gods - 2011

Other novels
 Lie Down, Killer — 	 1952
 The Peddler — 	 1963 (published in 1952 under pseudonym "Douglas Ring")
 The Peddler -  2006 by Hard Case Crime
As David Knight
 Pattern for Murder — 1952 (published in 1958 as The Scrambled Yeggs under Prather's name)
 Dragnet: Case No. 561 — 1956

As Douglas Ring
 The Peddler — 	 1952 (published in 1963 under Prather's name)

As editor 
 The Comfortable Coffin, stories by Ellery Queen, Evan Hunter, Stanley Ellin, Erle Stanley Gardner, and others

Notes

References 
 Reilly, John M., editor. Twentieth Century Crime and Mystery Writers (St. Martin’s Press, New York, 1980): entry
 Marquis Who’s Who in America (2002 edition): entry
 The Richard S. Prather / Shell Scott Website Archived - Last: 26 June 2012 - Visit: 26 June 2021

External links 
 Richard S. Prather at the Internet Book List

1921 births
2007 deaths
20th-century American novelists
21st-century American novelists
American male novelists
American thriller writers
American sailors
American mystery writers
Shamus Award winners
Writers from California
Riverside City College alumni
20th-century American male writers
21st-century American male writers
United States Merchant Mariners of World War II